They Were Actors is a 1981 Soviet adventure film directed by Georgy Natanson.

Plot 
The film takes place during the years of the occupation of Crimea by the Nazis. The film tells about a group of actors of the Simferopol Theater and their underground activities.

Cast 
 Zinaida Kirienko
 Igor Ledogorov
 Aleksandr Fatyushin
 Zhanna Prokhorenko	
 Vladimir Druzhnikov
 Nikolay Volkov	
 Yelizaveta Sergeyeva	
 Lyudmila Stoyanova
 Aristarkh Livanov
 Vladimir Zaytsev

References

External links 
 

1981 films
1980s Russian-language films
Soviet adventure films
1981 adventure films